

605001–605100 

|-bgcolor=#f2f2f2
| colspan=4 align=center | 
|}

605101–605200 

|-bgcolor=#f2f2f2
| colspan=4 align=center | 
|}

605201–605300 

|-bgcolor=#f2f2f2
| colspan=4 align=center | 
|}

605301–605400 

|-bgcolor=#f2f2f2
| colspan=4 align=center | 
|}

605401–605500 

|-bgcolor=#f2f2f2
| colspan=4 align=center | 
|}

605501–605600 

|-bgcolor=#f2f2f2
| colspan=4 align=center | 
|}

605601–605700 

|-bgcolor=#f2f2f2
| colspan=4 align=center | 
|}

605701–605800 

|-bgcolor=#f2f2f2
| colspan=4 align=center | 
|}

605801–605900 

|-bgcolor=#f2f2f2
| colspan=4 align=center | 
|}

605901–606000 

|-id=911
| 605911 Cecily ||  || Cecily Rankin (born 1987), wife of American amateur astronomer David Rankin, who discovered this Amor asteroid and near-Earth object. She holds a B.S. in advanced radiologic sciences. || 
|}

References 

605001-606000